Woodruff Leeming, AIA,  (July 14, 1870 – November 20, 1919) was an American architect who practiced in the New York area.

Biography
Born July 14, 1870, in Quincy, Illinois, he first trained at Adelphi College, and later the Massachusetts Institute of Technology. Early experience included working on the plans for the Cathedral of Saint John the Divine, New York (probably with Heins & LaFarge) before studying in Paris. Upon his return to America, he opened his own office. He served in World War I, joining as a major and later entering the Army Reserve Corps with the rank of lieutenant-colonel.

He married Esther Howard on November 6, 1899, and they had four children.

He resided in New Canaan, Connecticut, where he died on November 20, 1919.

Works
He designed the 1893 rectory for the South Congregational Church, Chapel, Ladies Parlor, and Rectory, Brooklyn, New York, which is now a New York City Landmark.

References

1870 births
1919 deaths
People from Quincy, Illinois
Architects from New York City
Architecture firms based in New York City
American military personnel of World War I
20th-century American architects
Architects from Illinois
Massachusetts Institute of Technology alumni